Sir Geoffry Alexander Stafford Northcote, KCMG KStJ (羅富國;9 February 1881 – 10 July 1948) was a British colonial administrator.

Early life, education, and early colonial services career
Northcote was the son of Reverend the Hon. Arthur Francis Northcote, fourth son of Stafford Northcote, 1st Earl of Iddesleigh. Henry Northcote, 1st Baron Northcote, was his uncle. He was educated at Blundell's School in Tiverton and Balliol College, Oxford. He entered the Colonial Service in 1904 and served in Kenya (the East African Protectorate) from 1904 to 1927. He became Chief Secretary of Northern Rhodesia a year later, and served there until 1930. Afterwards, Northcote served as the Chief Secretary of Gold Coast, until 1934 and as Governor and Commander-in-Chief of British Guiana from 1935 to 1937.

Attack in Kenya
When he arrived in Kenya in 1904 as a political attache, Northcote was posted to Nyanza Province which was then part of Uganda. In early 1905, he accompanied a punitive expedition to Kisii land in South Nyanza. The expedition carried out a month-long orgy of violence as punishment for raids the Kisii had carried out. In 1907, Northcote was deployed as the District Commissioner of Kisii. The Kisii, who nicknamed him Nyarigoti, considered him their mortal enemy. On 18 January 1908, in the middle of a punitive expedition he was leading, Northcote was attacked with a spear and injured by a warrior called Otenyo. When Otenyo was caught, he was tried in public, dragged by a horse and executed in public by a firing squad. He was then beheaded and his body shipped to London. When Northcote learned of these attacks to revenge the attack on him, which ended up costing 160 lives, he wrote to his father, "It would take too long to describe the idiocy, obstinacy and want of military operations."

Hong Kong Governorship

He became Governor and Commander-in-Chief of Hong Kong in 1937. During his tenure, the Second Sino-Japanese War broke out, and battles broke out throughout Mainland China. In order to safeguard the Colony, Northcote immediately declared Hong Kong a neutral zone. As the war proceeded, Canton (Guangzhou) was occupied by the Japanese, causing a population boom as refugees rushed into Hong Kong. Northcote proposed more provision of housing and social services to serve the needs of the poor. Meanwhile, the Japanese army also started encroaching upon Sham Chun (Shenzhen), leading the Hong Kong government to adopt various measures to cope with the emergency, such as the construction of air-raid shelters and blackout practices. Northcote also withdrew the plan of expanding social services.

After taking six-months' leave in the UK, Northcote returned to Hong Kong in March 1941. Poor health forced him to retire that year, and he left when his appointment expired in September 1941.

Personal life
Northcote married Edith Juliet Mary Adams on 27 October 1910; she was the daughter of James Adams. The couple had three sons: Maxwell Adams Stafford, Arthur Geoffrey Stafford, and Arnyas Henry Stafford. Northcote died in July 1948, aged 67.

Honours
 C.M.G., 1931
 K.C.M.G., 1935.
 K.St.J.

Places named after him
Northcote Close, a road on Hong Kong Island and Northcote Teachers' College (the premises is now occupied by Bonham Road Government Primary School) were named after him.

See also
 History of Hong Kong
 Earl of Iddesleigh
 Warrior Otenyo

Notes

References
 Kidd, Charles, Williamson, David (editors). Debrett's Peerage and Baronetage (1990 edition). New York: St Martin's Press, 1990, 

Governors of British Guiana
Governors of Hong Kong
1881 births
1948 deaths
Chief Secretaries of Northern Rhodesia
Chief Secretaries of the Gold Coast (British colony)
Alumni of Balliol College, Oxford
Knights Commander of the Order of St Michael and St George
Knights of the Order of St John
People educated at Blundell's School
Civil servants from London
20th-century Hong Kong people
20th-century British politicians